Kwaku Agyemang-Mensah is a Ghanaian politician who is a member of National Democratic Congress. He was the Minister of Health in the John Mahama Administration.

Politics 
Agyemang-Mensah was appointed by President John Mahama to serve as the Minister of Health in June 2014 to replace Sherry Ayittey who had been appointed as Minister of Fisheries and Aquaculture after a ministerial reshuffle.

References 

Living people
National Democratic Congress (Ghana) politicians
Health ministers of Ghana
People from Ashanti Region
Year of birth missing (living people)